Zgornja Korena is a settlement in the Municipality of Duplek in northeastern Slovenia. It lies on the southwestern edge of the Slovene Hills southeast of Maribor. The area is part of the traditional region of Styria. The municipality is now included in the Drava Statistical Region.

Church
The local parish church, built on a hill east of the village, is dedicated to Saint Barbara and belongs to the Roman Catholic Archdiocese of Maribor. It was built in 1787 on the site of a ruined 17th-century church.

Notable people
Notable people that were born in Zgornja Korena include the following:
 (1885–1946), literary historian, librarian, and linguist

References

External links
Zgornja Korena at Geopedia

Populated places in the Municipality of Duplek